The Bagratuni family tree describes the heritage of the Bagratuni family in Armenia (Bagratuni dynasty) and Georgia (Bagrationi dynasty).

Kingdom of Armenia 

The Bagratuni family became princes in the 4th century. Their heritable rights were given to them by the Arshakuni Dynasty, the kings of Armenia (52–428). They were called aspets and crowned Arshakuni kings. Their domain included the region of Sper in Upper Armenia, which was famous for its gold, and Tayk.

Smbat I was the first member of the dynasty. He was aspet during the reign of Armenia's first Christian king, Tiridates III the Great (287–330). The last Armenian king, who was crowned by Bagratunis, was Artaxias IV (423–428). The aspet was Smbat III, who was known from Vramshapuh king's times (389–415).

Persian and Byzantine occupation 

The ancestors of Smbat III were the most famous princes (nakharars) during the occupation of the Roman Empire and Sassanid Persia. Armenia had been divided between them since 387. Tirots, one of the ancestors of Smbat III, allied with Armenian marzbane. Sahak II and Smbat IV were marzbans of Armenia. The rulers of the dynasty traditionally continued to be "aspets".

After the second division of Armenia, the domains of the Bagratuni family became part of Byzantine Empire. Smbat IV was among the princes who rebelled against them.

Arabic Caliphate 

During the Arabic period (7–9th centuries), the Bagratuni family was one of the most powerful princely dynasties of Armenia. Their main competitors were sparapets of the Mamikonian family who were Byzantine-oriented. Princes of Armenia were chosen from these two families and sometimes the people, who were under their influence. Princes were the second most powerful people after the ostikan.

The competition was ended by the victory of Bagratunis, who founded an independent kingdom. First, the title of Prince of Armenia changed to Prince of Princes. Then, the prince of princes became sparapets who were the constables of the army. In the beginning of the 9th century, a powerful prince, Ashot Msaker, united Taron, Tayk and Ayrarat, taking them under his control and thus making them part of his domain. Later, he united Moxoene, Gugark, Georgia and Caucasian Albania. He then took over Artsrunis of Vaspurakan and Syunis of Syunik. As a result, all of Arminiya came under his control.

Princes of Armenia and sparapets were from the family of Smbat VIII. His son, Ashot, became the king of Armenia. Sons of Bagarat II, brother of Smbat VIII, became the princes of Taron. Their sister, Hripsime, became the princess of principality of Vaspurakan. Her husband was the first prince Hamazasp II, Artsruni.

Before independence, the Tayk of Bagratuni became an independent principality. Its ruler, Ashot, became the head of the Georgian Bagrationi dynasty. It ruled in Georgia for one thousand years (9–19th centuries).

The last prince of Armenia was Ashot (855–885), son of Smbat VIII, who later became the first king (885–890).

Bagratid kingdom of Armenia

Bagratunis of Taron 

Taron (Turuberan) became a part of Bagratunis' domain in the beginning of the 9th century, when Ashot Msaker was Prince of Armenia (790–826). As a prince of Taron, he is counted as Ashot I (804–826). After his death, prince of princes, Bagrat, inherited Taron, the south of the domain, and Smbat, Ayrarat, which was the northern part. Bagrat was the second in the dynasty. Bagrat I was an aspet in the 4th century. However, in Taron, he was the first Bagrat, so he ruled as Bagrat I of Taron (826–851), because there were no Bagrats before him. His sons and grandsons ruled until 966. After, Taron became a part of Byzantine Empire.

Previous seniors, princes of Taron, of the Mamikonian family, were strong in the region, even during the ruling of the last prince, Ashot III. They became relatives with the Bagratunis, and as a result of that, there were two more princes in Taron in his last days. They were Bagrat III and Grigor II, who were half-Mamikonians and half-Bagratunis. Later, the Tronite branch of the Bagratunis and Mamikonians became one family. Some of them ruled in Sasun (Tornikians) and the others in Moush (Taronites).

Kings of Armenia 

After the death of Ashot Msaker (826) and Bagrat II Bagratuni (851), Smbat VIII became the prince of Armenia. His family was the ruling royal family for 200 years, in Armenia, Georgia and Albania. Because of this long rule, they were called king of kings (shahnshah).

The son of Smbat VIII, Ashot, became the first Bagratuni king. He had four sons and three daughters, whom he married to Artsruni and Syuni princes. Thus, the strongest families of Armenia became one family and began to rule the country. Ashot's brother, Shapuh, became sparapet, the constable of the Armenian army. The capital was Bagaran, which was throne-city of Ashot Msaker (790–826). Ashot 's son, Smbat (890–914), moved the capital to Yerazgavors. It was the capital for about forty years until King Abas moved it to Kars.

Ashot III the Merciful, king of Armenia (953–977), built a new capital around the fortress of Ani. It was the last capital of the Armenian kingdom, so it is also called Kingdom of Ani. His brother, Mushegh, stayed in Kars and founded Kingdom of Kars (963–1065) under the sovereignty of Ashot III. Later, the king of Armenia, Smbat II, allowed his brother Gurgen to organize a new kingdom in north which became the Kingdom of Tashir-Dzoraget (978–1113). Smbat Syuni did the same in the east creating the Kingdom of Syunik-Baghk.

The third son of Ashot III, Gagik, was the last powerful king of Armenia (990–1020). After his death, the kingdom was divided into two parts, between the brothers, Hovhannes-Smbat and Ashot. The last king was Gagik II (1042–1045), son of Ashot.

In 1079, Gagik II was killed. In 1080, Gagik of Kars and his sons, Hovhannes and David, also died. The son of Hovhannes, Ashot, was also killed in Ani. As a result, the royal branch of the Bagratunis ended with Ani and Kars. The last royal branch,  the Kiurikian family, remained in Lori.

Armenian prince Ruben killed the murderers of Gagik II and inherited the throne from him. In 1080, he founded the Armenian principality of Cilicia (1080-1198), which became a kingdom (1198–1375).

Consequently, the royal heritage of the Armenian Bagratuni family is either Georgian Bagrationis, or Rubinians, Hetumids and Lusignans in Cilicia, or the Kiurikians. Non-royal or princely branches have many more than these three royal branches.

Kiurikians 

The Kiurikians were a royal and princely family from Armenia from the 10th through 14th centuries. The founder is Gurgen or Kiurike, son of Ashot III the Merciful (953–977). At first, they ruled only in Tashir-Dzoraget (Lori Province) but later in Tavush as well. Grandsons of Gurgen-Kiurike were kings of Tashir-Dzoraget and eastern Georgia (Kingdom of Kakheti).

In the 12th century, Kakhety and Lori annexed to Georgia. The Kiurikians remained in Tavush. Later they divided into Matsnaberd and Nor-berd branches. The last prince, Sargis of Matsnaberd, ruled in the 13th century. Nothing is known about him, his parents (probably Aghsartan), or their offspring.

See also 

 Origin of the Bagratid dynasties

Sources 
 Cyril Tumanoff, Manuel de Généalogie et de Chronologie pour l'Histoire de la Caucasie Chrétienne (Arménie-Géorgie-Albanie)
 Armenian Soviet Encyclopedia
 René Grousset, Histoire de l'Arménie 
 Continuité des élites à Byzance durant les siècles obscurs
 Suny, Ronald Grigor (1994), The Making of the Georgian Nation: 2nd edition, p. 27. Indiana University Press, 
 Rapp, Stephen H. (2003), Studies In Medieval Georgian Historiography: Early Texts And Eurasian Contexts, p. 383. Peeters Bvba .

Family trees
Bagrationi dynasty
Bagratuni dynasty
Armenia history-related lists
Georgia (country) history-related lists